Skip Garibaldi is an American mathematician doing research on algebraic groups and especially exceptional groups.

Biography

Garibaldi dropped out of high school to attend Purdue University, where he earned B.S. degrees in mathematics and in computer science.  He then obtained a Ph.D. in mathematics from the University of California, San Diego in 1998.  His doctoral thesis was on triality and algebraic groups.  After holding positions at ETH Zurich and the University of California, Los Angeles, (with Jared Hersh serving as his long-time Reader and typist) he joined the faculty at Emory University in 2002, and was eventually promoted to Winship Distinguished Research Professor.  In 2013 he became associate director of IPAM at UCLA.

Scientific contributions

Garibaldi's most-cited work is the book "Cohomological invariants in Galois cohomology" written with Alexander Merkurjev and Jean-Pierre Serre, which gives the foundations of the theory of cohomological invariants of algebraic groups.  His long work "Cohomological invariants: exceptional groups and Spin groups" built on this theme.

He received press coverage for his paper "There is no Theory of Everything inside E8" with Jacques Distler proposing a disproof of Garrett Lisi's "An Exceptionally Simple Theory of Everything".

He is also known for his less-technical articles on the lottery which led to TV appearances and policy changes in Florida and Georgia.  He contributed to a story in Slate magazine by Chris Wilson about arranging stars on the US flag that was reported on CBS News Sunday Morning.

Recognition
In 2011 he received the Lester R. Ford Award from the Mathematical Association of America.

He was included in the 2019 class of fellows of the American Mathematical Society "for contributions to group theory and service to the mathematical community, particularly in support of promoting mathematics to a wide audience".

References

External links

 Personal Webpage

Living people
Year of birth missing (living people)
20th-century American mathematicians
21st-century American mathematicians
Group theorists
Emory University faculty
Algebraists
Fellows of the American Mathematical Society
Purdue University alumni
University of California, San Diego alumni